Legal Mavericks (literally “Crossing the Line") is a Legal, Crime, Detective television drama created by Lam Chi-wah and TVB. It began principal photography in October 2016. It aired concurrently on TVB Jade, and iQiyi. The second season of this drama aired in 2020.

Synopsis
Since losing his eyesight in an accident, Man Sun-Hop has been continually harassed and despised. But instead, his determination and perseverance are so reinforced that he has qualified as a barrister. He has also developed an acute sense beyond sight which helps him to gain the status of Blind Legal Knight in the legal profession. However, nobody really knows his true character. Fortunately, Kuk Yat-Ha, his flatmate and private detective, and Chiu Ching-Mui, a legal executive with mob connections, are two buddies he can always rely on. The trio is known as the "Three Sword Fighters" who defy the powerful and are always ready to seek justice for the underprivileged. Sun-Hop’s provocative style has aroused the fancy of judge Wong Lai-Fan, which leads to her flirting unabashedly at him. Expanded to a quartet, their fate encounters turbulent changes while handling challenging legal cases. The reappearance of Sun-Hop’s father, Man Gun-Ying, and Tai Tin-Yan, his ex-girlfriend from college, further complicates the situation, which Sun-Hop may not be able to unravel with his legal mastery.

Cast and characters
Vincent Wong as Hope Man San-hap, a blind barrister who strives for justice for the disadvantaged, using his other heightened senses and legally controversial methods to seek truths behind his court cases. 
Sisley Choi as Deanie "Dino" Chiu Ching-mui, a legal executive working for Hope, who has a heroic spirit due to her mafia family background. In addition to being a law clerk, she also owns a bar called Pledge.
Ali Lee as Cherry "Never" Wong Lai-fan, a district court judge who is unafraid to challenge the conservative nature of the legal system.
Owen Cheung as Gogo Kuk Yat-ha, an ex-policeman turned private investigator due to an accident whilst investigating T.Y.. He becomes Hope Man's roommate.
Pal Sinn as T.Y. Tai Tak-yan, a cruel and ruthless businessman who has terrible relations with his two children due to his hunger for power. He is Yanice's father. 
Tracy Chu as Yanice Tai Tin-yan, an ophthalmologist who is constantly at heads with her father due to his problematic parenting methods. She is Hope Man's ex-girlfriend from university. 
Gilbert Lam, as Gotham Wei Gwok-haam, a famous and arrogant lawyer. He is one of Hope Man's major recurring opponents in court. Former mentor of Never and Walter
Quinn Ho as Luk Ka Yat, a friend of Gogo working at the police station.
Hugo Wong as Walter Wa Ye, a prosecutor who is skeptical of Hope Man's questionable methods of treating court cases. 
Jack Hui as Tai Tin-yau, T.Y.'s son and Yanice's older brother. He was mentally and physical abuse by his father , Tai Tak-yan . He turn himself to police in episode 7 for illegal detention  and mentally abusing of Suki .
Law Lok-lam as Man Gan-ying, Hope's father, who abandoned Hope at the age of 6 not long after he went blind. He is diagnosed with ALS. 
Chun Wong as Chiu Cheong-Fung, Dino's father, an ex prominent member of the mafia. 
William Chak as Aiden Ching Lap-Kiu, Yanice's ex-fiancé. 
Toby Chan as Annie (Poon On), a male-to-female transgender. Kindergarten Teacher , Friend of Deanie.  client of Hope Man , defence of the Transgender sexual assault case ( Episode 10-13)
Li Fung 
Bob Cheung as Lau Chi-Sum, a mentally-disabled person framed for giving poison to dogs. A client of Hope Man , defence of the Mentally handicapped poison dog case (Episode 1 - 2) 
Raymond Chiu as Henry (Ah Chun), Friend of Gogo
Ho Chun-hin as Liu Ting, gang leader who works for Tai Tak-yan.
Zoie Tam as Ngai Yu-Chun,  a client of Hope Man, defence of the Female performance artist assaulting case (Episode 2 - 3 )
Fung So-bor as Mrs. Lau , mother of Lau Chi-sim 
Fanny Lee as Bo Bui-yee, Hope Man's landlord and Gogo's aunt.
Tong Chun-ming as Dragon , employee of Pledge bar
Tse Ho-yat as Tiger , employee of Pledge bar 
Virginia Lau as Zhu , employee of Pledge bar 
Hebe Chan as Hillary, Poon On's ex girlfriend before Poon On undergoes gender transformation.  Initially, refuses to help female transgender, Poon On testify in a sexual assault case because Hillary does not want her current fiancé to find out she dated a transgender.
Poon Fong-fong as Kindergarten principal ,  Former supervisor of Annie (Poon On)
Nicole Wan as Mrs.Wu , mother of David was a student of Annie. She accused Annie of alleged indecent  in tennis court female locker room because her husband is a homosexual and she targeted  discriminate against them.
Otto Chan (actor) as Hilton , husband of Mrs.Wu and secretly a homosexual who has an affair with a physical trainer , Mountain
Man Yeung as Fong Kin Chung , Husband of Yeung Mei Ling and father of Sing ,  client of Hope Man , defence of the Neglect of child care case  (Episode 7-10)
Janice Shum as Yeung Mei Ling , Stepmother of Sing , client of Hope Man , defence of the Neglect of child care case  (Episode 7-10)
Kimmi Tsui  as Lee Wai Sze , Biological mother of Sing. Scheme and framed both Fong Kin Chung and Yeung Mei Ling for neglecting and child abuse to gain back the custody of kid Sing
Chiu Lok-yin as Rivet , lackey of Liu Ting
Aaryn Cheung as Wu , employee of Pledge bar

Critical reception
Legal Mavericks received positive responses. On Douban, a Chinese media database, the drama received a rating of 7.9 out of 10 based on 5000+ votes.

The cast of Legal Mavericks won numerous awards the 2017 StarHub TVB Awards: 
FAVOURITE TVB ACTOR - Vincent Wong
FAVOURITE TVB ACTRESS - Ali Lee
FAVOURITE TVB SUPPORTING ACTOR - Owen Cheung
FAVOURITE TVB FEMALE TV CHARACTERS - Sisley Choi and Tracy Chu

Vincent Wong won the Best Actor award at the 2017 TVB Anniversary Awards, and Sisley Choi won the Most Popular Female Character award with her role as Deanie Chiu.

In 2018, New York Festivals awarded Legal Mavericks as finalists in Best Screenplay and in Best Entertainment Program Open & Titles.

References

TVB dramas
Hong Kong action television series
2010s Hong Kong television series
Hong Kong crime television series